Fritzie is a given name. Notable people with the given name include:

Fritzie Abadi (1915–2001), Syrian American painter, sculptor, and collage artist
Fritzie Connally (born 1958), American baseball player
Fritzie Zivic (1913–1984), American boxer

See also
Fritzi